The 1978 St. John's Redmen baseball team represented the St. John's University in the 1978 NCAA Division I baseball season. The Redmen played their home games at Redman Field. The team was coached by Joe Russo in his 5th year at St. John's.

The Redmen won the Northeast Regional to advance to the College World Series, where they were defeated by the North Carolina Tar Heels.

Roster

Schedule 

! style="" | Regular Season
|- valign="top" 

|- align="center" bgcolor="#ffcccc"
| 1 || March 23 || at  || Foley Field • Athens, Ohio || 4–5 || 0–1
|- align="center" bgcolor="#ccffcc"
| 2 || March 23 || at Georgia || Foley Field • Athens, Georgia || 13–11 || 1–1
|- align="center" bgcolor="#ccffcc"
| 3 || March 24 || at  || Furman Baseball Field • Greenville, South Carolina || 5–3 || 2–1
|- align="center" bgcolor="#ccffcc"
| 4 || March 27 || at  || Ernie Shore Field • Winston-Salem, North Carolina || 3–2 || 3–1
|- align="center" bgcolor="#ccffcc"
| 5 || March 28 || at North Carolina Tar Heels || Boshamer Stadium • Chapel Hill, North Carolina || 15–5 || 4–1
|- align="center" bgcolor="#ffcccc"
| 6 || March 30 || at  || Unknown • Norfolk, Virginia || 0–1 || 4–2
|- align="center" bgcolor="#ffcccc"
| 7 || March 30 || at Old Dominion || Unknown • Norfolk, Virginia || 3–6 || 4–3
|- align="center" bgcolor="#ccffcc"
| 8 || March 31 || at  || Unknown • Richmond, Virginia || 11–0 || 5–3
|- align="center" bgcolor="#ccffcc"
| 9 || March 31 || at VCU || Unknown • Richmond, Virginia || 9–2 || 6–3
|-

|- align="center" bgcolor="#ccffcc"
| 10 || April 1 || at  || Malcolm U. Pitt Field • Richmond, Virginia || 16–3 || 7–3
|- align="center" bgcolor="#ccffcc"
| 11 || April 1 || at Richmond || Malcolm U. Pitt Field • Richmond || 3–2 || 8–3
|- align="center" bgcolor="#ccffcc"
| 12 || April 3 || at  || University Field • Hempstead, New York || 19–2 || 9–3
|- align="center" bgcolor="#ccffcc"
| 13 || April 4 || at  || Unknown • New York, New York || 15–7 || 10–3
|- align="center" bgcolor="#ccffcc"
| 14 || April 5 || at  || Owen T. Carroll Field • South Orange, New Jersey || 7–1 || 11–3
|- align="center" bgcolor="#ccffcc"
| 15 || April 6 ||  || Redman Field • New York, New York || 5–1 || 12–3
|- align="center" bgcolor="#ccffcc"
| 16 || April 8 ||  || Redman Field • New York, New York || 27–8 || 13–3
|- align="center" bgcolor="#ccffcc"
| 17 || April 8 || Siena || Redman Field • New York, New York || 15–7 || 14–3
|- align="center" bgcolor="#ccffcc"
| 18 || April 9 || at  || Unknown • New Haven, Connecticut || 10–8 || 15–3
|- align="center" bgcolor="#ffcccc"
| 19 || April 10 ||  || Redman Field • New York, New York || 1–3 || 15–4
|- align="center" bgcolor="#ffcccc"
| 20 || April 11 ||  || Redman Field • New York, New York || 4–5 || 15–5
|- align="center" bgcolor="#ffcccc"
| 21 || April 12 ||  || Redman Field • New York, New York || 6–8 || 15–6
|- align="center" bgcolor="#ccffcc"
| 22 || April 13 || at  || Unknown • Teaneck, New Jersey || 15–2 || 16–6
|- align="center" bgcolor="#ccffcc"
| 23 || April 14 ||  || Redman Field • New York, New York || 5–4 || 17–6
|- align="center" bgcolor="#ccffcc"
| 24 || April 15 ||  || Redman Field • New York, New York || 3–1 || 18–6
|- align="center" bgcolor="#ffcccc"
| 25 || April 15 || Catholic || Redman Field • New York, New York || 8–11 || 18–7
|- align="center" bgcolor="#ffcccc"
| 26 || April 16 || Seton Hall || Redman Field • New York, New York || 0–7 || 18–8
|- align="center" bgcolor="#ccffcc"
| 27 || April 17 ||  || Redman Field • New York, New York || 9–0 || 19–8
|- align="center" bgcolor="#ffcccc"
| 28 || April 18 || at  || Robertson Field at Satow Stadium • New York, New York || 0–10 || 19–9
|- align="center" bgcolor="#ffcccc"
| 29 || April 21 || at Adelphi || Unknown • Garden City, New York || 4–8 || 19–10
|- align="center" bgcolor="#ccffcc"
| 30 || April 22 ||  || Redman Field • New York, New York || 6–0 || 20–10
|- align="center" bgcolor="#ccffcc"
| 31 || April 23 || at  || Erny Field • Philadelphia, Pennsylvania || 10–8 || 21–10
|- align="center" bgcolor="#ccffcc"
| 32 || April 24 ||  || Redman Field • New York, New York || 6–1 || 22–10
|- align="center" bgcolor="#ccffcc"
| 33 || April 25 ||  || Redman Field • New York, New York || 15–2 || 23–10
|- align="center" bgcolor="#ccffcc"
| 34 || April 26 ||  || Redman Field • New York, New York || 11–0 || 24–10
|- align="center" bgcolor="#ccffcc"
| 35 || April 27 || Fairleigh Dickinson || Redman Field • New York, New York || 13–10 || 25–10
|- align="center" bgcolor="#ffcccc"
| 36 || April 29 || at  || Beaver Field • University Park, Pennsylvania || 5–6 || 25–11
|- align="center" bgcolor="#ccffcc"
| 37 || April 29 || at Penn State || Beaver Field • University Park, Pennsylvania || 10–9 || 26–11
|-

|- align="center" bgcolor="#ffcccc"
| 38 || May 1 || at  || J. O. Christian Field • Storrs, Connecticut || 5–7 || 26–12
|- align="center" bgcolor="#ccffcc"
| 39 || May 2 ||  || Redman Field • New York, New York || 11–4 || 27–12
|- align="center" bgcolor="#ccffcc"
| 40 || May 3 ||  || Redman Field • New York, New York || 7–2 || 28–12
|- align="center" bgcolor="#ffcccc"
| 41 || May 4 ||  || Redman Field • New York, New York || 1–3 || 28–13
|- align="center" bgcolor="#ffcccc"
| 42 || May 7 || at  || LIU Baseball Stadium • New York, New York || 2–3 || 28–14
|- align="center" bgcolor="#ccffcc"
| 43 || May 13 ||  || Redman Field • New York, New York || 2–1 || 29–14
|- align="center" bgcolor="#ccffcc"
| 44 || May 13 || Queens || Redman Field • New York, New York || 7–2 || 30–14
|- align="center" bgcolor="#ccffcc"
| 45 || May 15 ||  || Redman Field • New York, New York || 4–2 || 31–14
|-

|-
! style="" | Postseason
|- valign="top"

|- align="center" bgcolor="#ccffcc"
| 46 || May  || vs Richmond || Unknown • Unknown || 7–2 || 32–14
|- align="center" bgcolor="#ffcccc"
| 47 || May  || vs  || Unknown • Unknown || 4–5 || 32–15
|- align="center" bgcolor="#ccffcc"
| 48 || May  || vs Richmond || Unknown • Unknown || 2–1 || 33–15
|- align="center" bgcolor="#ccffcc"
| 49 || May  || vs Cornell || Unknown • Unknown || 2–0 || 34–15
|- align="center" bgcolor="#ccffcc"
| 50 || May  || vs Cornell || Unknown • Unknown || 10–1 || 35–15
|-

|- align="center" bgcolor="#ffcccc"
| 51 || May  || vs  || Mackenzie Stadium • Holyoke, Massachusetts || 3–5 || 35–16
|- align="center" bgcolor="#ccffcc"
| 52 || May  || vs  || Mackenzie Stadium • Holyoke, Massachusetts || 8–0 || 36–16
|- align="center" bgcolor="#ccffcc"
| 53 || May  || vs Holy Cross || Mackenzie Stadium • Holyoke, Massachusetts || 14–12 || 37–16
|- align="center" bgcolor="#ccffcc"
| 54 || May  || vs  || Mackenzie Stadium • Holyoke, Massachusetts || 7–4 || 38–16
|- align="center" bgcolor="#ccffcc"
| 55 || May 28 || vs Temple || Mackenzie Stadium • Holyoke, Massachusetts || 8–5 || 39–16
|- align="center" bgcolor="#ccffcc"
| 56 || May 28 || vs Temple || Mackenzie Stadium • Holyoke, Massachusetts || 15–6 || 40–16
|-

|- align="center" bgcolor="#ffcccc"
| 57 || June 2 || vs Arizona State || Johnny Rosenblatt Stadium • Omaha, Nebraska || 2–13 || 40–17
|- align="center" bgcolor="#ffcccc"
| 58 || June 3 || vs North Carolina || Johnny Rosenblatt Stadium • Omaha, Nebraska || 5–9 || 40–18
|-

References 

St. John's Red Storm baseball seasons
St. John's Redmen baseball
College World Series seasons